Grover is a town in Taylor County, Wisconsin, in the United States. As of the 2010 census, the town population was 256. The unincorporated community of Perkinstown is located in the town.

Geography
Grover is a large town - six miles by twelve. According to the United States Census Bureau, the town has a total area of 71.4 square miles (184.8 km2), of which, 70.7 square miles (183.0 km2) of it is land and 0.7 square miles (1.8 km2) of it (0.99%) is water.

Much of Grover is hilly with little glacial lakes. It is part of the Perkinstown terminal moraine, which is discussed in the article on Taylor County. Because the land would be difficult to farm, much of Grover's land was incorporated into the Chequamegon–Nicolet National Forest, and the town includes five of Taylor County's twelve State Natural Areas: Brush Creek Hemlocks, Perkinstown Hemlocks, Pirus Road Swamp, Richter Lake Hemlocks, and Yellow River Ice-walled Lake Plain.

History
The two six mile squares that would become Grover were first surveyed in the summer of 1847 by a crew working for the U.S. government. Then in the winter of 1857 and 1858 another crew marked all the section corners in the township, walking through the woods and over frozen swamps, measuring with chain and compass. When done, the deputy surveyor filed this general description of the six mile square north of Perkinstown:
This Township contains numerous small Tamarac and Cedar Swamps. These are generally unfit for cultivation. There are some few marshes that are very good for hay. The surface is generally rolling; Soil mostly second rate except on some of the Birch and Maple ridges it is first rate.  Timber chiefly Hemlock, Birch, Maple, Pine, Tamarac and Cedar.Yellow River runs through the North West corner of this Township in a South Westerly course. It is a deep narrow Stream flows in a gentle Current no(?) good for forming motive Power for Mills. There are several small creek running in different Directions bank generally high and dry.

Demographics
As of the census of 2000, there were 233 people, 93 households, and 70 families residing in the town. The population density was 3.3 people per square mile (1.3/km2). There were 135 housing units at an average density of 1.9 per square mile (0.7/km2). The racial makeup of the town was 97.42% White and 2.58% Native American. Hispanic or Latino of any race were 0.43% of the population.

There were 93 households, out of which 28.0% had children under the age of 18 living with them, 72.0% were married couples living together, 1.1% had a female householder with no husband present, and 23.7% were non-families. 21.5% of all households were made up of individuals, and 10.8% had someone living alone who was 65 years of age or older. The average household size was 2.51 and the average family size was 2.89.

In the town, the population was spread out, with 22.7% under the age of 18, 6.9% from 18 to 24, 30.5% from 25 to 44, 24.0% from 45 to 64, and 15.9% who were 65 years of age or older. The median age was 40 years. For every 100 females, there were 102.6 males. For every 100 females age 18 and over, there were 102.2 males.

The median income for a household in the town was $38,125, and the median income for a family was $42,500. Males had a median income of $29,531 versus $25,875 for females. The per capita income for the town was $18,031. About 2.9% of families and 2.5% of the population were below the poverty line, including none of those under the age of eighteen and 11.1% of those 65 or over.

References

Towns in Taylor County, Wisconsin
Towns in Wisconsin